This article is a list of endorsements made by members of the 112th United States Congress and other elected officials during the 2012 Republican Party presidential primaries. Endorsements of statesmen and celebrities are also important to candidates.  Late in the Republican race cycle, Romney toured Israel and Poland after a visit to the London 2012 Olympics. He received the endorsement of former President of Poland Lech Wałęsa, and soon after, the endorsement of actor Clint Eastwood. The winning of endorsements, also known as the Endorsement Race or Endorsement Derby, is argued to be a vital feature of the United States presidential race and the political party system.



Tier 1

Former Presidents of the United States

Withdrawn 2012 Republican candidates

Current Governors

Current Senators

Current Representatives

Tier 2 (State Senators and Representatives)

Michele Bachmann (withdrawn)

Herman Cain (withdrawn)

Newt Gingrich (withdrawn)

Jon Huntsman (withdrawn)

Gary Johnson (withdrawn)

Ron Paul

Rick Perry (withdrawn)

Mitt Romney

Rick Santorum (withdrawn)

Tier 3 (Statesmen, former politicians, and celebrities)

Michele Bachmann (withdrawn)

Herman Cain (withdrawn)

Newt Gingrich (withdrawn)

Jon Huntsman (withdrawn)

Ron Paul

Rick Perry (withdrawn)

Mitt Romney

Rick Santorum (withdrawn)

See also 
 Republican Party presidential primaries, 2012

External links 
 Political Endorsements 2012 
 Roll Call
 The Hill

References 

Endorsements
2012 United States presidential election endorsements